Buli is a barangay in Muntinlupa, Philippines. It has a population of 7,319 making it the least populated barangay in Muntinlupa. It is located in the northern section of the city.

Buli is located south of the Manila. It is bounded on the north by the Muntinlupa barangay of Sucat, on the south by the Muntinlupa barangay of Cupang, and on the east by Laguna de Bay.

History
Buli is said to be named after the buri palm that is abundant in the area.

See also
 Muntinlupa

References

External links

Muntinlupa
Barangays of Metro Manila